This article lists the main modern pentathlon events and their results for 2017.

2018 YOG qualification events
 August 9 – 12: YOG 2018 Continental Qualifier - Europe (Tetrathlon) in  Mafra
 Youth Individual winners:  Giorgio Malan (m) /  Michelle Gulyás (f)
 Youth Men's Team winners:  (Riccardo Testarmata, Stefano Frezza, & Giorgio Malan)
 Youth Women's Team winners:  (Maria Lea Lopez, Alice Rinaudo, & Beatrice Mercuri)
 August 30 – September 3: YOG 2018 Continental Qualifier - Pan America (Tetrathlon) in  Mérida
 Youth Individual winners:  Sergio Flores (m) /  Melissa Mireles (f)
 Youth Men's Team winners:  (Sergio Flores, Alexis Vazquez, & Jesus Avalos)
 Youth Women's Team winners:  (Melissa Mireles, Catherine Mayran Oliver, & Alejandra García)
 September 11 – 17: YOG 2018 Qualifier - Asia / Oceania (Tetrathlon) in  Gotemba
 Youth Individual winners:  SHIN Hyo-seop (m) /  YUAN Xin (f)
 Youth Men's Team winners:  (SHIN Hyo-seop, KIM Jun-young, & MOON Ju-seong)
 Youth Women's Team winners:  (YUAN Xin, XIE Linzhi, & GU Yewen)
 December 5 & 6: YOG 2018 Continental Qualifier – Africa (Tetrathlon) in  Lagos
 Youth Individual winners:  Rhys Poovan (m) /  Alida van der Merwe (f)
 Youth Men's Team winners:  (Rhys Poovan, Luke Bradley, & Alexander Schliemann)
 Youth Women's Team winners:  (Evelyn Nmor, Ayomide Bello, & Happy Kegbe) (default)

World modern pentathlon championships
 July 17 – 24: 2017 World Youth "A" (U19) Modern Pentathlon Championships in  Prague
 Youth Individual winners:  KIM Woo-cheol (m) /  Adelina Ibatullina (f)
 Youth Team Relay winners:  (Ahmed Elgendy & Mohanad Shaban) (m) /  (Maria Lea Lopez & Beatrice Mercuri) (f)
 Youth Mixed Team Relay winners:  (Elena Micheli & Giorgio Malan)
 Youth Men's Team winners:  (KIM Woo-cheol, KANG Seong-hyeon, & KIM Kyoung-hwan)
 Youth Women's Team winners:  (Elena Micheli, Alice Rinaudo, & Beatrice Mercuri)
 August 7 – 14: 2017 World Junior Modern Pentathlon Championships in  Székesfehérvár
 Junior Individual winners:  Daniele Colasanti (m) /  Kim Sun-woo (f)
 Junior Team Relay winners:  (SO Hyun-seok & SEO Chang-wan) (m) /  (Anna ZS. Toth & Eszter Varga) (f)
 Junior Mixed Team Relay winners:  (Nikolai Matveev & Xeina Fralcova)
 Junior Men's Team winners:  (Gianluca Micozzi, Daniele Colasanti, & Matteo Cicinelli)
 Junior Women's Team winners:  (Elena Micheli, Irene Prampolini, & Aurora Tognetti)
 August 21 – 29: 2017 World Modern Pentathlon Championships in  Cairo
 Individual winners:  Jung Jin-hwa (m) /  Gulnaz Gubaydullina (f)
 Team Relay winners:  (Jun Woong-tae & Hwang Woo-jin) (m) /  (Annika Schleu & Lena Schöneborn) (f)
 Mixed Team Relay winners:  (Ronja Steinborn & Alexander Nobis)
 September 10 – 16: 2017 CISM World Modern Pentathlon Championships in  Drzonków
 Individual winners:  Ádám Marosi (m) /  Lina Batuleviciute (f)
 Mixed Team Relay winners:  (Élodie Clouvel & Valentin Belaud)
 Men's Team winners:  (Ádám Marosi, Soma Tomaschof, & Róbert Kasza)
 Women's Team winners:  (Ekaterina Khuraskina, Sofia Serkina, & Svetlana Lebedeva)

Continental modern pentathlon championships
 June 8 – 11: 2017 Pan American and NORCECA Modern Pentathlon Championships in  Santo Domingo
 Individual winners:  Manuel Padilla (m) /  Tamara Vega (f)
 Men's Team winners:  (Manuel Padilla, Melchor Silva, & Alvaro Sandoval)
 Women's Team winners:  (Tamara Vega, Priscila Espinoza, & Mayan Oliver)
 June 24 – July 1: 2017 European Junior Modern Pentathlon Championships in  Barcelona
 Junior Individual winners:  Marek Grycz (m) /  Irene Prampolini (f)
 Junior Team Relay winners:  (Ivan Tarasov & Andrei Zuev) (m) /  (Rebecca Langrehr & Anna Matthes) (f)
 Junior Mixed Team Relay winners:  (Lisa Riff & Jean-Baptiste Mourcia)
 Junior Men's Team winners:  (Danila Glavatskikh, Serge Baranov, & Alexander Lifanov)
 Junior Women's Team winners:  (Veronika Efimova, Xeina Fralcova, & Sofia Serkina)
 July 17 – 24: 2017 European Modern Pentathlon Championships in  Minsk
 Individual winners:  Aleksander Lesun (m) /  Anastasiya Prokopenko (f)
 Team Relay winners:  (Ondřej Polívka & Martin Bilko) (m) /  (Annika Schleu & Lena Schöneborn) (f)
 Mixed Team Relay winners:  (Kirill Belyakov & Gulnaz Gubaydullina)
 August 30 – September 3: 2017 European Youth "A" (U19) Modern Pentathlon Championships (Tetrathlon) in  Caldas da Rainha
 Youth Individual winners:  Jean-Baptiste Mourcia (m) /  Maria Lea Lopez (f)
 Youth Mixed Team Relay winners:  (Elena Micheli & Giorgio Malan)
 Youth Men's Team winners:  (Jean-Baptiste Mourcia, Ugo Fleurot, & Xavier Dufour)
 Youth Women's Team winners:  (Maria Lea Lopez, Elena Micheli, & Alice Rinaudo)
 August 30 – September 3: 2017 Pan American Junior Modern Pentathlon Championships in  Mérida
 Junior Individual winners:  Emiliano Hernandez (m) /  Juliana Borgarucci (f)
 Junior Men's Team winners:  (Emiliano Hernandez, Damian Garza, & Luis Cruz)
 September 12 – 17: 2017 Asia-Oceania Modern Pentathlon Championships in  Gotemba
 Individual winners:  LUO Shuai (m) /  Rena Shimazu (f)
 Mixed Team Relay winners:  (Kim Sun-woo & Jung Jin-hwa)
 Men's Team winners:  (LUO Shuai, ZHANG Linbin, & LI Shuhuan)
 Women's Team winners:  (ZHENG Lishan, WEI Danni, & ZHONG Xiuting)
 October 14 – 20: 2017 European U24 Modern Pentathlon Championships in  Drzonków
 U24 Individual winners:  Yaraslau Radziuk (m) /  Natalia Dominiak (f)
 U24 Mixed Team Relay winners:  (Sarolta Simon & Norbert Horvath)
 U24 Men's Team winners:  (Yaraslau Radziuk, Pavel Yeusiyevich, & Ivan Ivanov)
 U24 Women's Team winners:  (Sarolta Simon, Anna ZS. Toth, & Karolina Palkovics)
 December 14 – 18: 2017 South American Modern Pentathlon Championships in  Cochabamba
 Individual winners:  Esteban Bustos (m) /  Iryna Khokhlova (f)
 Mixed Team Relay winners:  (William Muinhos & Priscila Oliveira)
 Men's Team winners:  (Emmanuel Zapata, Leandro Silva, & Sergio Villamayor)
 Women's Team winners:  (Iryna Khokhlova, Ayelen Zapata, & Pamela Zapata)

2017 Modern Pentathlon World Cup
 February 20 – 27: MPWC #1 in  Los Angeles
 Individual winners:  Bence Demeter (m) /  Lena Schöneborn (f)
 Mixed Team Relay winners:  (Jung Jin-hwa & Yang Soo-jin)
 March 21 – 26: MPWC #2 in  Cairo
 Individual winners:  Pavlo Tymoshchenko (m) /  Kate French (f)
 Mixed Team Relay winners:  (Iryna Prasiantsova & Kiril Kasyanik)
 May 3 – 8: MPWC #3 in  Kecskemét
 Individual winners:  Valentin Prades (m) /  Laura Asadauskaitė (f)
 Mixed Team Relay winners:  (Bence Demeter & Sarolta Kovács)
 May 24 – 29: MPWC #4 in  Drzonków
 Individual winners:  Jun Woong-tae (m) /  Alice Sotero (f)
 Mixed Team Relay winners:  (Natalya Coyle & Arthur Lanigan-O'Keeffe)
 June 21 – 25: MPWC #5 (final) in  Vilnius
 Individual winners:  Valentin Prades (m) /  Tamara Alekszejev (f)
 Mixed Team Relay winners:  (Natalya Coyle & Arthur Lanigan-O'Keeffe)
 Men's Team winners:  (Valentin Prades, Alexandre Henrard, & Valentin Belaud)
 Women's Team winners:  (Annika Schleu, Lena Schöneborn, & Ronja Steinborn)

References

External links
 Union Internationale de Pentathlon Moderne Website (UIPM)

 
Modern pentathlon
2017 in sports